Lieutenant Leslie Jacob Rummell (1895-1919) was an American World War I flying ace credited with seven aerial victories.

Biography
A graduate of Cornell University, Rummell joined the 93d Aero Squadron on 7 August 1918. He shot down his first Fokker D.VII on 12 September over Thiacourt. His triple win on the 29th, when he downed two more Fokker D.VIIs and shared a win over an Albatros two-seater, won him the Distinguished Service Cross. He went on to score three more times in October, including a shared win with Chester Wright.

Rummell died in the influenza pandemic of 1919, on 2 February.

Honors and awards
Distinguished Service Cross (DSC)

The Distinguished Service Cross is presented to Leslie J. Rummell, First Lieutenant (Air Service), U.S. Army, for extraordinary heroism in action in the region of Moirey, France, September 29, 1918. Lieutenant Rummell, leading a patrol of three planes, sighted an enemy biplace airplane which was protected by seven machines (Fokker type). Despite the tremendous odds, he led his patrol to the attack and destroyed the biplace. By his superior maneuvering and leadership, four more of the enemy planes were destroyed and the remaining three retired.

See also

 List of World War I flying aces from the United States

References

Bibliography
 American Aces of World War I. Norman Franks, Harry Dempsey. Osprey Publishing, 2001. , .

1895 births
1919 deaths
Recipients of the Distinguished Service Cross (United States)
American World War I flying aces
Cornell University alumni
Aviators from New Jersey
Deaths from the Spanish flu pandemic in France